Delfin was the first combat-capable Russian submarine. She was commissioned in 1903 and decommissioned in 1917, having served during World War I. During a test dive in 1904, 25 crew were killed.

Design
Delfin was designed by Naval architect Senior Assistant Ivan Grigoryevich Bubnov, Lieutenant M.N. Beklemishev and Lieutenant I.S. Goryunov of the Construction Commission for Submarines (later the Rubin Design Bureau). The design was of a single-hull type submarine with saddle tanks whose outer plating was covered with teak to prevent damage in the case of grounding. She was ordered in July 1901 laid down by Baltic Works at St. Petersburg, launched in 1902, and entered service in 1903, training officers and sailors. Initially the vessel was classed as a torpedo boat and only given a number instead of a name.

General characteristics
Delfin displaced 113 tons surfaced and 126 tons submerged. The submarine was powered by one gasoline/electric motor that created 300 bhp and 120 hp respectively that drove one shaft. This gave Delfin a speed of  surfaced and  submerged. The ship was crewed by 22 men, including officers.

Armament
Delfins main armament was two external  torpedoes in Drzewiecki drop collars. The boat was also equipped with one machine gun.

Service history
While undergoing her first sea trials, Delfins ballast tanks were faulty and it took 12 minutes to complete her dive. This foreshadowed future events for the vessel. On 29 June 1904 the submarine sank in the Neva River by the wall of the Baltic Shipyard during a test dive. The captain and 24 crewmen were killed, and 12 men were rescued. The vessel was raised 3 July and transferred to the Siberian flotilla, arriving in Vladivostok in late 1904. Delfin returned to service in February 1905.

In May 1905, Delfin sank again after suffering an explosion due to petrol vapours. She returned to service after the Russo-Japanese War had ended.

During World War I Delfin was transferred to Murmansk in October 1916 and served in the Northern flotilla. She was found to be unsuitable for combat operations and was deleted in August 1917. While awaiting disposal in Murmansk, she was sunk. The remains were scrapped in 1920.

The centenary of Delfin’s sinking - the first Russian submarine accident - was marked by the St. Petersburg Submariners Club with wreath-laying, a mourning service, and by guards of honor and an orchestra marching at the Smolenskoye Orthodox cemetery.

Notes

References
 

1902 ships
Russo-Japanese War naval ships of Russia
Ships built at the Baltic Shipyard
Submarines of the Imperial Russian Navy
World War I submarines of Russia